Deadwood is an unincorporated community in Tuolumne County, California, United States. Deadwood is located along a logging railroad known as the West Side Lumber Company Railroad.

References

Unincorporated communities in Tuolumne County, California
Populated places in the Sierra Nevada (United States)
Unincorporated communities in California